Jennifer Burton (born February 27, 1968) is an American model and actress in B-movies and erotic films. She is sometimes credited as Jennifer Jarret or Jennifer Leigh Burton.

Career 
Early in her career, Burton had roles in softcore productions such as Playtime. She also had small roles in the erotic series Emmanuelle. Later, she starred as a main and supporting actor in several movies and TV productions, including Mischievous and Illusions of Sin.

In July 1990, Burton was cover girl of the Greek Playboy magazine.

Filmography

Film

Television

References 

1968 births
Living people
American film actresses
21st-century American women